Landenberg Junction is a railroad junction in Elsmere, New Castle County, Delaware.

It situated at the southern end of CSX Transportation's Philadelphia Subdivision Wilsmere Yard. The junction is the eastern terminus of the Wilmington and Western Railroad, which originally ran to Landenberg, Pennsylvania. Both lines were formerly owned by the Baltimore and Ohio Railroad (B&O).

The Wilmington and Western Railroad line ran from the junction at Elsmere to Landenberg, PA until the 1940s when the B&O decided to cut back the line to Southwood and eventually, in the 1950s, to Hockessin. The current Wilmington and Western Railroad operates tourist trains between Greenbank and Hockessin.

References

Rail junctions in the United States
CSX Transportation
Baltimore and Ohio Railroad